Sour clover is a common name for several plants and may refer to:

Melilotus indicus, native to Europe and Africa and widely naturalized
Trifolium fucatum, native to western North America

See also
Oxalis